The 1984 Arizona Wildcats football team represented the University of Arizona in the Pacific 10 Conference (Pac-10) during the 1984 NCAA Division I-A football season. In their fifth season under head coach Larry Smith, the Wildcats compiled a 7–4 record (5–2 against Pac-10 opponents), finished in a tie for third place in the Pac-10, and outscored their opponents, 272 to 192. The team played their home games at Arizona Stadium in Tucson, Arizona.

The Wildcats were placed on probation by both the NCAA and Pac-10 in May 1983 following the discovery of cash payments to student-athletes and players as well as allegations of fraud involving former Arizona coach Tony Mason in a scandal that rocked the university. Due to the NCAA violations, Arizona was ineligible for the 1984 Pac-10 championship and was banned from playing in a bowl game (including the Rose Bowl). They were also barred from playing games on live television during the season as well as 1985.

Before the season
The Wildcats completed the 1983 season with a record of 7–3–1 (4–3–1 in Pac-10). They did not participate in a bowl game due to the NCAA sanctions for recruiting violations. Arizona was deeply affected by the penalties when it came to recruiting during the offseason.

Arizona entered the 1984 season believing that they would win despite being on probation, though they would neither be competing for the Rose Bowl nor being shown on television. The NCAA had announced in May 1983 that the Wildcats would be barred from both a bowl game and having games aired live on TV. As a result of the TV ban, Arizona games were not aired on national or cable networks.

Schedule

Personnel

Game summaries

LSU
Arizona traveled to Baton Rouge to play Louisiana State (LSU) in the first meeting between the two schools. The Wildcats fought tough and ultimately came up short against the Tigers.

Oregon

The Wildcats played Oregon at home. After a close first half, Arizona took control in the second half and defeated the Ducks.

Washington
On the road at Washington, Arizona's offense struggled at times against the top-ranked Huskies’ defense, which to a Wildcats loss.

Arizona State

The Wildcats played their season finale against rival Arizona State. In front of an Arizona Stadium crowd, the Wildcats did enough against the Sun Devils in low-scoring contest, and Arizona came out victorious over ASU for the third year in a row. The offense managed to get only one touchdown and kicker Max Zendejas, who defeated ASU the previous year with a field goal, made three kicks, including 51 and 32 yard attempts in the fourth quarter, during the win. It was the first time since 1960-62 that the Wildcats defeated their rivals in three consecutive seasons. Arizona finished the season with seven wins, matching their 1983 total.

Season notes
Arizona's seven victories were enough to be bowl-eligible, but due to NCAA sanctions, they were not eligible for the postseason.
The loss to LSU would be the closest that the Wildcats would ever come to defeating the Tigers, as they lost big in future meetings in 2003 and 2006.
After starting out the season with a 4–4 record, the Wildcats won their final three games to finish with a winning record. As they were banned from the postseason, the team treated their finale against Arizona State as their bowl game, and ultimately won it.
All of Arizona's home games this season (as well as 1985) were televised on a local Tucson station and were all aired on a tape delay and broadcast the day after due to the games not airing live as a result of the team's TV ban. None of the Wildcats’ road games were aired on TV due to the ban.

References

Arizona
Arizona Wildcats football seasons
Arizona Wildcats football